Dheeraj Jadhav (born 16 September 1979), is an Indian cricketer who currently plays for Assam. He has represented Mumbai Champs in the Indian Cricket League and Maharashtra in domestic cricket. Although he used to bat in the middle order, he later became a stroke-playing opening batsman which produced immediate results. After good performances for India A, including a century in an India v India A game he was called up into the Test squad for the 4th Test vs Australia at Mumbai in 2004. After 52 First Class games, he has achieved an impressive average of 52 with a highest score of 260 not out.

In 2011, Dheeraj signed to play for Pune Warriors India in the 2011 Indian Premier League cricket tournament,

Dheeraj signed a contract to play cricket in England in 2008, 2009 & 2010 for Horwich R.M.I. Cricket Club in the Bolton Cricket League.

Dheeraj had a successful first season at Horwich RMI. He scored 939 runs in just 15 innings, averaging over 85 runs per innings. He also broke the club record for the most runs scored in a single innings, with his 164 not out against Bradshaw Cricket Club.

External links
 

1979 births
Living people
Indian cricketers
Assam cricketers
East Zone cricketers
Maharashtra cricketers
West Zone cricketers
ICL World XI cricketers
Mumbai Champs cricketers
Indian cricket coaches